Midu or MIDU may refer to:

Midu County, Yunnan, China
Midu language, a possibly Sino-Tibetan language spoken in border regions of India and China
Midu (actress) (born 1989), Vietnamese actress
MIDU, ticker symbol for the Direxion Daily Mid Cap Bull 3X Shares ETF
Midu, the main character of the Pakistani television series Anokha Ladla

See also
Midus, a type of Lithuanian mead
Midou, a river in France
Meedhoo (disambiguation)